The Y is a 2023 Indian Hindi Psychological horror film written and directed by Girideva Raaj and produced by Rocket Films.

The film stars Yuvan Hariharan, Leonilla D'Souza, Prithal Pawar, Kamal Ghimiray, Abhinava Kiran and Apsara in lead roles. The film was released on 6th january 2023.

Cast
Yuvan Hariharan as Yuvan
Leonilla D'Souza as Diksha 
Prithal Pawar as Sonu
Abhinava Kiran as Abhi
Kamal Ghimiray as Psychiatrist 
Apsara as Vidhya
Bhairavi as Younger Diksha
Bhuvan Brahmadev as Younger Yuvan

Synopsis
The female lead unintentionally becomes silent. The couple starts a new chapter in their lives after her marriage, but they quickly run into a new issue. After receiving a present from an unidentified source, the protagonist encounters strange occurrences, and their ordinary lives become the subject of a mysterious tale. The intrigue of the movie is whether she is experiencing trauma as a result of her prior experiences or whether there is a spirit in the gift that has just arrived and how the two of them are able to solve the mystery.

Reception
The Y received mixed to positive reviews from critics. The Times of India gave it 2.6 out of 5 rating. The Indian films and entertainment website Bollywood Hungama gave it 5 out of 5 rating.

References

External links 
 

2023 films
Indian thriller films
2023 horror films
Indian horror films
Psychological horror films